William Jopling (2 March 1911 – 21 August 1997)  was an Italian-born British leprologist who together with D. S. Ridley proposed the Ridley-Jopling classification of leprosy (1962), and wrote the widely read textbook of "Handbook of Leprosy" which had a fifth edition.  He had a wide understanding of leprosy problems based on his experiences as the director of Jordan hospital, a leprosy hospital (1950–1967) in England and wrote various articles including "leprosy stigma".

Life

Early life
He was born in Pozzuoli, near Naples, Italy and educated at Norman Court School, New Barnet and Queen Elizabeth's Grammar School for Boys, Barnet. He graduated from London University (St. Barthlomew's Hospital) in 1936 and studied medicine and obstetrics, as an intern, ending as a ship doctor traveling to the Far East.

Later in 1938, he went to Hartley, Southern Rhodesia (now Chegutu, Zimbabwe), Africa, with his wife, and chiefly engaged in medicine and obstetrics. He transferred a patient with leprosy in his government car to a leprosarium and became interested in the disease. During World War II, he went into the volunteer Medical Corps.

In August 1947, he returned to London with his family at age 36 and took postgraduate studies, specializing in tropical medicine. After the war, some of Hansen's disease patients came from other countries, and he took the new post of the director of Jordan Hospital, specializing in leprosy. The number of beds was only 24. After 17 years, it closed and a few patients were transferred to other facilities.

The Jordan Hospital (1950-1967)
Together with Ridley, he established the Ridley-Jopling classification of leprosy, which is the standard of classification, although WHO added a simple classification of multibacillary leprosy and paucibacillary leprosy for practical reasons.  He was interested not only in the classification, but also in leprosy reactions, and he finally found the designator of Erythema Nodosum Leprosum, asking any visitors to his hospital. He had remained Consultant in Tropical Medicine at St. John's Hospital for Diseases of the Skin until his retirement.  He participated in a multidrug therapy trial in Malta.

Ridley-Jopling Classification
The axis of classification is the degree of Lepromin reaction. Kensuke Mitsuda first reported the lepromin reaction in 1919, which is usually called the Mitsuda reaction. This reaction was completed by Fumio Hayashi.

Leprosy stigma
Applying Goffman's definition, he explained various instances of leprosy stigma both in Europe and in other parts of the world. The general public has many misconceptions about leprosy and health authorities should launch an information campaign that the disease is curable and patients on treatment are noninfectious.  Various factors are present, including religions and laws. Present-day leprosy stigma will disappear with the eradication of leprosy with multidrug therapy.

Handbook of Leprosy
This textbook had been widely available since its first edition in 1971. It has been translated into Spanish and Chinese.

Comments by others
"He seldom initiated research, but the dependability of his clinical judgment made him an invaluable and much sought-after research partner, and for many years he was a central figure in the Hospital for Tropical Disease's leprosy research programme."

Awards
Jopling and Ridley were jointly awarded the Sir Rickard Christophers Medal by the Royal Society of Tropical Medicine and Hygiene in 1994.

References

Obituary William Jopling 1911-1997 D.S.Ridley, Lepr Rev 1998,69.75-76.
Handbook of Leprosy Fifth Edition Jopling WH, McDougall AC. S.K.Jain for CBS Publishers and Distributors 1996.
(Autobiography) Recollections and reflections. William H Jopling. The Star, 51,4,5-10,1992, March/April.

1911 births
1997 deaths
British leprologists
English dermatologists
British parasitologists
People from Pozzuoli
People educated at Queen Elizabeth's Grammar School for Boys
British hospital administrators
British expatriates in Italy